Another 48 Hrs. is a 1990 American buddy cop film directed by Walter Hill and starring Eddie Murphy, Nick Nolte, Brion James, Andrew Divoff, and Ed O'Ross. It is the sequel to the 1982 film 48 Hrs. Nolte reprises his role as San Francisco police officer Jack Cates, who has 48 hours to clear his name from a manslaughter charge. To do so, he again needs the help of Reggie Hammond (Murphy), who is a newly released convict. At the same time, a mastermind known only as the Iceman has hired a biker gang to kill Reggie.

Plot
Veteran San Francisco police inspector Jack Cates has been after drug dealer the "Iceman" for the past four years. At the Hunter's Point Raceway, Jack confronts Tyrone Burroughs and Arthur Brock. Jack kills Brock, while Burroughs escapes. Despite killing Brock in self-defense, Jack is now under investigation, as Brock's gun cannot be found at the scene. Blake Wilson, the head of the Internal Affairs division, becomes determined to prosecute Jack on a third-degree manslaughter charge. Jack finds a picture that proves that the Iceman has put a price on the head of Reggie Hammond, who is scheduled to be released from prison the next day.

Reggie has completed his prison term for robbing a payroll (a crime for which he claims complete innocence), which he had been serving six months before. He is scheduled to be released. Jack tries to convince Reggie to help him clear his name and find the Iceman. Reggie requests that Jack gives him the $500,000 that Jack has been holding on to for him. Jack refuses to give Reggie the money unless Reggie helps him. After the bus transporting Reggie is attacked by two bikers and Jack gets shot, Jack forces Reggie to help him by having the hospital release Reggie into his custody. Reggie recognizes one of the two bikers as Richard "Cherry" Ganz, the brother of Albert Ganz, the escaped convict Jack killed years earlier. Cherry and his partner Willie Hickok are the hitmen hired to kill Reggie. Burroughs, who works for the Iceman, was trying to hire Brock as insurance, just in case Cherry and Hickok failed. When the Iceman murders Hickok's primary contact man, Malcolm Price, Hickok kills Burroughs, after the latter reveals himself to be an associate of the Iceman.

Reggie is captured by Cherry and Hickok, and Jack confronts the two criminals at a local nightclub where Ben Kehoe—Jack's friend and fellow officer—is revealed to be the Iceman, with another detective, Frank Cruise, serving as an accomplice. A gunfight ensues, with Jack wounding Hickok and killing Cruise. After killing both Hickok and Cherry, Reggie is held captive by Kehoe and used as a human shield. Reggie sarcastically begs Jack to shoot him. Jack does so, firing a shot into Reggie's shoulder, wounding him and throwing him off Kehoe. Jack then shoots Kehoe, killing him. Before Reggie is transported to the hospital, he and Jack share a few parting words. As the ambulance leaves with Reggie, Jack realizes that Reggie has once again stolen his lighter although he decides to let Reggie keep it out of respect.

Cast

Production

Development and writing
Eddie Murphy had been paid $200,000 for his role in the original film. By the time of the sequel, his fee was $12,000,000 up front, plus a percentage of the gross.

The film was based on an original story by Murphy who asked Hill if he was interested in directing. 

Hill added that "the plot – which Eddie suggested – is actually kind of intriguing. So why not do it?... A lot of folks will say I'm just doing it for the money. What I want to know is, why do they think I made the first one?"

Post-production
The original workprint of the film was 145 minutes long. It was cut by either director Walter Hill or the Paramount studio down to 120 minutes, and a week before its summer theatrical release an additional 25 minutes were cut out by Paramount, making a final theatrical version 95 minutes long, but also creating lot of plot holes and continuity mistakes in the film. Frank McRae's reprisal of his role from the original 48 Hrs. was entirely cut except for a brief, uncredited shot of him in the background of one scene in the police station. Also removed was a scene which was partially shown in the theatrical trailer in which Jack explains to Reggie that he has a deadline to track down the Iceman; as such, there is no mention of '48 hours' anywhere in the final film. Brion James, also returning from the original, saw his role severely cut down as well, to create a faster-paced action-comedy. In an interview, James said this about the cuts made on the film:

Music

 "The Boys Are Back In Town" - Jesse Johnson 4:01
 "Give It All You Got" - Curio 4:37
 "I Just Can't Let It End" - Curio 3:52
 Another 48 Hrs., film score~The Courthouse - James Horner 3:18
 Another 48 Hrs., film score~Main Title - James Horner 4:11
 Another 48 Hrs., film score~King Mei Shootout - James Horner 7:36
 Another 48 Hrs., film score~Birdcage Battle - James Horner 4:43
 I'll Never Get You Out of This World Alive - Michael Stanton 2:25

Reception

Box office
The film grossed more at the US box office than its predecessor and made $72.7 million from foreign markets for a total of $153.5 million. However this was considered a box office disappointment and because the film was so costly, profits were minimized. Murphy accused Paramount of not spending enough on advertising and changing the release date. Paramount counter-alleged that Murphy did not spend enough time promoting the film. This led to tension in the long-running relationship between Murphy and Paramount.

Critical response
On Rotten Tomatoes the film holds an approval rating of 20% based on 35 reviews, with an average rating of 4.2/10. The website's critics consensus reads: "Even the return of Eddie Murphy, Nick Nolte, and director Walter Hill can't hide the lazy, patchwork quality of Another 48 Hrs." On Metacritic, the film has a weighted average score of 23 out of 100, based on 13 critics, indicating "generally unfavorable reviews". Audiences polled by CinemaScore gave the film an average grade of "A−" on an A+ to F scale.

Vincent Canby of The New York Times stated that it was "as much a star vehicle for Mr. Murphy as The Gorgeous Hussy once was for Joan Crawford. The Crawford name isn't idly invoked. You have to go back to the old MGM days to find movies that, with every gesture, let the audience know it was watching a star." Canby continued, "Though the body count is high, all of the people killed are faceless or only minor characters, until the end. It's as if the movie were saying that lethal violence is acceptable (and fun) as long as the victims–like the victims of guided missiles and high-altitude bombing–remain anonymous. Any comedy that allows the mind to ponder high-altitude bombing is in deep trouble."

Los Angeles Times critic Peter Rainer called it "a crude rehashing of the high points of the first film." Ranier singled out director Hill, who he said "surely recognizes the hollowness of what he's doing here. He tries to ram through the muddled exposition as quickly as possible; essentially, the film is wall-to-wall mayhem, with more shots of hurled bodies shattering windows than I've ever seen in a movie."

References

External links

 
 
 
 

1990 action comedy films
1990s buddy cop films
1990s crime comedy films
1990s English-language films
American action comedy films
American buddy cop films
American crime comedy films
American police detective films
American sequel films
Fictional portrayals of the San Francisco Police Department
Films about contract killing in the United States
Films about the illegal drug trade
Films directed by Walter Hill
Films scored by James Horner
Films set in San Francisco
Films with screenplays by Jeb Stuart
Outlaw biker films
Paramount Pictures films
1990s American films